Michael P. Downing was the interim Chief of Police of the Los Angeles Police Department.  On August 5, 2009, Chief William J. Bratton announced that after seven years as chief he would be stepping down from his position. He continued to serve as LAPD chief until October 30, 2009. After Bratton stepped down, Downing was appointed as Chief of Police by the L.A. Board of Police Commissioners. As of January 2014, Downing is a 29-year veteran of the Department.

On November 17, 2009, the Los Angeles City Council approved Charles L. Beck as the new LAPD Chief of Police. He was sworn in and is the 56th chief.

References

Living people
Chiefs of the Los Angeles Police Department
Year of birth missing (living people)